Meteora sporadica is a mysterious free-living protozoan discovered in 2002 during sampling at a depth of 1,230 meters below sea level in the Sporades Basin, part of the Mediterranean Sea. So far it is the only species of the genus Meteora.

It was placed as Protista incertae sedis due to its unique morphology unlike any other group of protists. Two decades later, a 2022 phylogenetic analysis of Meteora still wasn't able to solidly relate it to any known group of eukaryotes, suggesting that it could be a new high-level eukaryotic group.

The cell body is colorless and ovular. It ranges between 3.0 and 4.4 µm in length and 2.0–4.0 μm in width. It has two lateral arm-like appendages and two axial appendages. The lateral appendages move independently of each other in a rowing motion, assisting in locomotion.

References

Protista
Protists described in 2002